Turkish may refer to:

a Turkic language spoken by the Turks
 of or about Turkey
 Turkish language
 Turkish alphabet
 Turkish people, a Turkic ethnic group and nation
 Turkish citizen, a citizen of Turkey
 Turkish communities and minorities in the former Ottoman Empire
 Ottoman Empire (Ottoman Turkey), 1299–1922, previously sometimes known as the Turkish Empire
 Ottoman Turkish, the Turkish language used in the Ottoman Empire 
 Turkish Airlines, an airline
 Turkish music (style), a musical style of European composers of the Classical music era

See also 

 
 
 Turk (disambiguation)
 Turki (disambiguation)
 Turkic (disambiguation)
 Turkey (disambiguation)
 Turkiye (disambiguation)
 Turkish Bath (disambiguation)
 Turkish population, the number of ethnic Turkish people in the world
 Culture of Turkey
 History of Turkey
 History of the Republic of Turkey

Language and nationality disambiguation pages